Judy Maddren is a Canadian radio announcer who works primarily for CBC Radio.

She first joined CBC in 1972, and worked as a consumer affairs reporter; at that time, CBC was not hiring women as announcers. When this policy changed, in 1975, Maddren was the third woman to be hired.

From 1993 to 2009, she hosted or co-hosted CBC Radio's national morning newscast, World Report.

She is the sister-in-law of Peter Elliott.

On March 17, 2009, she announced that she was retiring from the CBC; her last broadcast was on World Report on March 27, 2009. She continues to guest host Rewind on CBC Radio One for Michael Enright along with fellow guest hosts and producers Marieke Meyer and Jeff Goodes.

References

Living people
Canadian radio news anchors
University of Guelph alumni
Canadian women radio journalists
Canadian women television journalists
Year of birth missing (living people)